NA-37 may refer to:

NA-37 (Tank), a constituency for the National Assembly of Pakistan
NA-16-4R (NA-37), a variant of the North American Aviation NA-16 aircraft
 Sodium-37 (Na-37 or 37Na), an isotope of sodium